Sammy Hagar and the Circle (also known as The Circle) is an English-American rock supergroup band originally formed in Miami in 2014, consisting of former Montrose and Van Halen vocalist Sammy Hagar, original Van Halen bassist Michael Anthony, drummer Jason Bonham and guitarist Vic Johnson. The group released a live album called At Your Service on 19 May 2015, and a live DVD of the same name in December of that same year.

The band released a new album of original material, Space Between, on 10 May 2019. Hagar debuted one of the new songs at his High Tide Beach Party & Car Show in 2018. The first single from Space Between, "Trust Fund Baby", was released on 28 January 2019.

On 30 September 2022 the band released Crazy Times featuring "Pump It Up", the first single and video.

Personnel 
Sammy Hagar – lead vocals, guitars
Michael Anthony – bass guitar, vocals
Jason Bonham – drums, percussion
Vic Johnson – lead guitar, vocals

Discography 
Studio albums

 Space Between (2019)
 Lockdown 2020 (2021)
 Crazy Times (2022)

Live albums

 At Your Service (2015)

References 

Van Halen
American hard rock musical groups
English hard rock musical groups
Musical groups from Miami